The following is a list of avifauna books for countries and regions of the world, including authoritative field guides.

Europe

 Birds in England, by Andy Brown and Phil Grice, T. & A. D. Poyser, 2005
 Birds in Ireland, by Clive D. Hutchinson, T. & A. D. Poyser, 1989
 Birds of Europe, by Killian Mullarney, Lars Svensson, Dan Zetterström, and Peter J. Grant, Princeton University Press, 1999
 Peterson Field Guide to Birds of Britain and Europe, by Roger Tory Peterson, G. Mountfort, and P.A.D. Hollom, Houghton Mifflin, 1993 (5th Edition)
 Birds in Scotland, by Valerie Thom, T. & A. D. Poyser, 1986
 Birds in Wales, by Iolo Williams, Graham Williams, and Roger Lovegrove, T. & A. D. Poyser, 1994

Asia
 Birds of India, by Richard Grimmett, Carol Inskipp, and Tim Inskipp, Princeton University Press, 1999), limited text.
 A Field Guide to the Birds of Korea, by Woo-Shin Lee, Tae-Hoe Koo, and Jin-Young Park, L.G. Evergreen Foundation, 2000
 A Field Guide to the Birds of China, by John MacKinnon and Karen Phillipps (illustrator), Oxford University Press, 2000
 The first comprehensive, fully illustrated field guide for the region
 A Guide to the Birds of South-East Asia, by Craig Robson, Princeton University Press, 2000
 A Field Guide to the Birds of Japan, text by Wild Bird Society of Japan, illustrations by Shinji Takano, 1982
 Classic fully illustrated field guide; out of print
 Handbook of the birds of India and Pakistan, together with those of Bangladesh, Nepal, Bhutan and Sri Lanka, by Salim Ali and Dillon S. Ripley. 10 volumes. Oxford University Press. New Delhi. 1998. Reprinted 2001; out of print.
 Birds of South Asia. The Ripley Guide by Pamela C. Rasmussen and John C. Anderton. Two volumes. Lynx Edicions, Barcelona, 2005.
A Field Guide to the Birds of Thailand by Craig Robson, New Holland Press, 2004 
A Guide to the Birds of Thailand, Boonsong Lekagul & Philip Round,    Saha Karn Baet, 1991

Africa and the Middle East

 A Guide to the Birds of Western Africa, by Nik Borrow and Ron Demey, Princeton University Press, 2002
 Field Guide to the Birds of the Middle East, by R. F. Porter, S. Christensen, P. Schiermacker-Hansen, T. & A. D. Poyser, 1996
 The Birds of Israel, by Hadoram Shirihai, Princeton University Press, 1996
 Birds of Southern Africa, by Ian Sinclair, Phil Hockey, and Warwick Tarboton, Princeton University Press, 2002
 The Birds of East Africa, by Terry Stevenson and John Fanshawe, Academic Press, 2001
 Field Guide to the Birds of Kenya and Northern Tanzania, by Dale A. Zimmerman, Donald A. Turner, and David J. Pearson, Princeton University Press, 1999
 Birds of The Gambia, Barlow, Wacher and Disley,

North America

 Birds of North America, by Kenn Kaufman, Houghton Mifflin, 2000
 Innovative field guide employing digitally enhanced photographs
 Field Guide to the Birds of North America, National Geographic Society, 2002 (4th Edition)
 First field guide (in 1983) to cover all of North America; considered by many to have been the most authoritative guide until Sibley
 A Field Guide to the Birds of Eastern and Central North America, by Roger Tory Peterson and Virginia Marie Peterson (editor), Houghton Mifflin, revised 2002A Field Guide to Western Birds, by Roger Tory Peterson and Virginia Marie Peterson (editor), Houghton Mifflin, revised 1990
 The current incarnations of the seminal A Field Guide to the Birds, the first modern field guide published by Peterson in 1934
 The Sibley Guide to Birds, by David Allen Sibley, Alfred A.Knopf, 2000
 The current standard in identification guides for North America; exhaustively illustrated and oversized for a field guide (although there are field-sized Eastern and Western editions), limited text.

Central America and the Caribbean

 Field Guide to Birds of the West Indies, by James Bond, Houghton Mifflin, 1985 (5th Edition)
 A guide to the birds of Mexico and northern Central America, by Steve N.G. Howell and Sophie Webb, Oxford University Press, 1995
 A Guide to the Birds of the West Indies, by Herbert Raffaele, James Wiley, Orlando Garrido, Allan Keith, and Janis Raffaele, Princeton University Press, 1998
 A Guide to the Birds of Panama with Costa Rica, Nicaragua, and Honduras, by Robert S. Ridgely and John A. Gwynne, Jr., Princeton University Press, 1989 (2nd Edition)
 A Guide to the Birds of Costa Rica, by F. Gary Stiles and Alexander F. Skutch, Cornell University Press, 1989
 Birds of the Dominican Republic and Haiti, by Steven Latta, Christopher Rimmer, Allan Keith, and James Wiley (Princeton Field Guides), Princeton University Press, 2006 (also printed in Spanish and French)
  Birds of Trinidad and Tobago, by Richard ffrench,  
 Birds of Cuba, by Orlando Garrido and Arturo Kirkconnell, Helm Field Guides, London, 2000

South America

 A Guide to the Birds of the Galapagos Islands, by Isabel Castro and Antonia Phillips, Princeton University Press, 1997
 A Guide to the Birds of Peru, by James F. Clements, Ibis Publishing, 2001
 A Guide to the Birds of Colombia, by Steven L. Hilty and William L. Brown, Princeton University Press, 1986
 Birds of Venezuela, by Steven L. Hilty, Princeton University Press, 2003
 Birds of Chile, by Alvaro Jaramillo, Princeton University Press, 2003
 The Birds of Ecuador, by Robert S. Ridgely and Paul J. Greenfield, Cornell University Press, 2001
 The Birds of South America, by Robert S. Ridgely and Guy Tudor, University of Texas Press, 1994

Australasia

 The Field Guide to the Birds of Australia, by Graham Pizzey and Frank Knight (illustrator), HarperCollins, 1997
 Field Guide to the Birds of Australia, by Ken Simpson and Nicolas Day, Princeton University Press, 1999 (6th Edition)

Antarctica

 Birds of Southern South America and Antarctica, by Martin R. de la Peña and Maurice Rumboll, Princeton University Press, 2001

Oceania

 A Field Guide to the Birds of Hawaii and the Tropical Pacific, by H. Douglas Pratt, Phillip L. Bruner, and Delwyn G. Berrett, Princeton University Press, 1987

Ornithological literature